The 1986 VMI Keydets football team was an American football team that represented the Virginia Military Institute (VMI) as a member of the Southern Conference (SoCon) during the 1986 NCAA Division I-AA football season. In their second year under head coach Eddie Williamson, the team compiled an overall record of 1–10 with a mark of 1–5 in conference play, placing seventh in the SoCon.

Schedule

References

VMI
VMI Keydets football seasons
VMI Keydets football